Robert K. Weiss is an American film and television producer. His productions include films by director John Landis, producer Lorne Michaels, and the "Z. A. Z." team of Jim Abrahams, David Zucker, and Jerry Zucker. He also co-created the science-fiction TV series Sliders. He is a graduate of Southern Illinois University Carbondale. 

Weiss has been the President and Vice Chairman of the X Prize Foundation since 1996. 

In the film Blues Brothers 2000, the name of Robert K. Weiss is mentioned (to the confusion of Donald "Duck" Dunn) in a speech by Elwood Blues as the final name in a long list of legendary blues and soul artists that Elwood names to convince his band not to quit. This is presumably a reference to how Weiss convinced Dan Aykroyd (who portrayed Elwood) and director John Landis not to quit the film.

Credits
 Kentucky Fried Movie (1977): producer, actor
 The Blues Brothers (1980): producer
 Police Squad! (TV series, 1980): producer
 Doctor Detroit (1983): producer
 The Compleat Al (made for video, 1985): producer, writer, director (videos "Dare to Be Stupid," "Like a Surgeon," "One More Minute", "This is The Life")
 Dragnet (1987): producer
 Amazon Women on the Moon (1987): producer, director (segments "Murray in Videoland", "Amazon Women on the Moon", "Silly Paté", "Video Pirates", "First Lady of the Evening", "Titan Man")
 The Naked Gun: From the Files of Police Squad! (1988): producer, second unit director, actor (uncredited)
 UHF (1989): actor
 Crazy People (1990): producer, second unit director, actor
 Nothing but Trouble (1991): producer, actor
 The Naked Gun 2½: The Smell of Fear (1991): producer, second unit director, actor
 Weird Science (TV series, 1994–1997): executive producer
 Naked Gun : The Final Insult (1994): producer, second unit director, actor
 Sliders (TV series, 1995–2000): co-creator, executive producer (season 1), second unit director (pilot), executive consultant (seasons 2–3)
 Tommy Boy (1995): executive producer, actor
 Black Sheep (1996): executive producer
 A Night at the Roxbury (1998): executive producer
 Superstar (1999): executive producer
 The Ladies Man (2000): executive producer
 Scary Movie 3 (2003): producer
 Scary Movie 4 (2006): producer
 Superhero Movie (2008): producer

External links
 

American film producers
American television producers
Living people
1951 births
Southern Illinois University Carbondale alumni